The Springfield Lucky Horseshoes are a collegiate summer league baseball team of the Prospect League. They play at Robin Roberts Stadium at Lanphier Park and are based in the city of Springfield, Illinois. The team was established in November 2007 as the Springfield Sliders and were an expansion franchise for the 2008 season. The Lucky Horseshoes and other collegiate summer leagues and teams exist to give top college players professional-like experience without affecting NCAA eligibility.

The Central Illinois Collegiate League (CICL) season was divided into two-halves with the first half winner playing the second half winner in a best-of-three series.  The Sliders dominated the first half of the 2008 season with a 20–4 record, winning by seven games.  Springfield won the CICL Regular Season Championship with a 30–17 record, leaving the 2nd place team 4.5 games behind.  In the 2008 playoffs, Springfield defeated the Danville Dans in three games to win the 2008 CICL Championship.

The CICL merged with the Prospect League after the 2008 season, with the Prospect League name carrying forward into the 2009 season and beyond. Today, the Lucky Horseshoes are a member of the Western Conference of the Prospect League in the Prairie Land Division with the Alton River Dragons, Cape Catfish, and O'Fallon Hoots.

History
The Sliders are the third collegiate wood bat franchise in Springfield. The Springfield Capitals were the first, operating from 1963 to 1977 as a member of the CICL. After the 1977 season, the Capitals ceased operations to make way for a minor league team, the Springfield Redbirds, for the 1978 season. The Springfield Redbirds would serve as the Triple-A affiliate of the St. Louis Cardinals for four seasons, winning an American Association championship in 1980.

After the Redbirds controversially moved to Louisville for the 1982 season and became the Louisville Redbirds, Springfield was without a baseball team for one season.

The Springfield Rifles began play in 1983 and were members of the CICL through 2006. The Rifles played their home games at Lincoln Land Community College for all but one season, and suffered from extremely low attendance. Beginning in 1996 and running through 2001, Springfield was also home to the second version of the Springfield Capitals who this time were a member of the Frontier League.

The Sliders won their first game in franchise history against the Quincy Gems, 7–3.

The team won the Western Division championship in 2010 (won both halves of the season) and played in the Western Division championship series after the 2016 as the 2nd Half champions, but lost the series to the Quincy Gems.

The inclusion of the Gems in the 2016 series was controversial due to the Prospect League allowing an extra game played by the Gems to count in the standings for the season's 1st Half. The Gems and the DuPage Drones played a 31st game, while the remaining four teams only played thirty games. The Sliders, had the Gems only been able to count thirty games for the season's 1st Half, would have won both halves of the season, as they held a tiebreaker over the Gems. Such a decision would have seen the Sliders and Drones play in the Western Division championship series, as the Drones had the second-best overall season record in the division. Quincy would go on to lose the Prospect League Championship Series to the West Virginia Miners. The Prospect League has since abandoned the first half winner and second half winner playoff format, instead opting to have the two teams with the best overall season records in each division advance to their respective divisional playoffs.

On February 17, 2022, the Sliders rebranded as the Springfield Lucky Horseshoes, named after the sandwich that originated in Springfield.

Gun giveaway controversy
During the 2016 season, the Sliders announced that an in-game promotion during their June 22 game against the DuPage Drones would feature a 50/50 drawing for a choice of several guns. The promotion drew attention and anger from a number of fans in the local community, given the short amount of time between the giveaway and the mass murder of 49 people at Pulse nightclub in Orlando. The team's owner and General Manager, Todd Miller, told local media outlets that he gave thought to cancelling the giveaway, planned well in advance of the terrorist act, but instead chose to go forward with the promotion. Miller and the owner of the gun store providing the firearms emphasized that the weapons would not be at the stadium during the giveaway and that the winner would still have to comply with all applicable laws for purchasing a gun, in order to claim their prize. The game saw triple the number of fans in attendance than a typical game that season. The team has since given away two more guns at its games.

Former players in professional baseball
Since joining the Prospect League for the 2009 season, the Sliders have seen several players drafted by MLB teams. Elliot Soto was selected in the 2010 MLB draft by the Chicago Cubs and made his MLB debut in 2020 with the Los Angeles Angels. Most recently, Chatham, Illinois (just south of Springfield) native Nick Maton was selected in the 2017 MLB draft by the Philadelphia Phillies in the 7th round and made his MLB debut with the Phillies in 2021.

Seasons

Stadium
The Lucky Horseshoes play at Robin Roberts Stadium. The stadium opened in 1928 and was renovated/expanded over the years to its current 5,200 seat capacity. During the 2017 season, 29,532 fans attended Sliders games at Robin Roberts stadium, ranking the facility as the fourth-most visited stadium in the Prospect League. The stadium has been the home to a number of minor league and independent teams since it opened in 1928. During the 2019 season, just under 28,000 fans attended Sliders games at the stadium, ranking the facility as the third-most visited stadium in the Prospect League, despite the team's on-field performance, which saw it set a new league record for most losses in a season at 48.

Roster

References

External links 
Official Site

Amateur baseball teams in Illinois
Prospect League teams
Lucky Horseshoes
Baseball teams established in 2007
2007 establishments in Illinois